The Association of Canadian Editorial Cartoonists, or ACEC, is a professional association founded in 1988 in Winnipeg to promote the interests of editorial cartoonists in Canada.

In 2015, it changed its name to Association of Canadian Cartoonists.

Townsie awards recognize exceptional contributions to cartooning in Canada.

References

External links
 

Canadian journalism organizations
Professional associations based in Canada
Organizations established in 1988
Comics-related organizations in Canada
1988 establishments in Manitoba